Hans Groop, born 1932 in Vaasa is a Finnish yacht designer based in Helsinki.

He has designed more than a hundred yachts and motorboats, the most famous being the H-boat, one of the most popular yacht classes in the world. Hans Groop has been a lifelong member of the HSS - a leading yachtclub for smaller keelboats in the Nordics. The club initiated the H-boat in 1967 in order to replace the popular but by then outmoded Hai-boat.

Some of his other designs are the H-35, H-40, H-star, H-323, Targa 42, Targa 96, Finnsailor 34 and 29, Degerö 33, Joe 17, Joe 34, Netta, IS 400, Artina 29 and Artina 33 as well as a lot of one-off boats.

References

1932 births
Living people
Finnish yacht designers
Swedish-speaking Finns